Dacusville is a small unincorporated community and census-designated place (CDP) in Pickens County, South Carolina, United States. It is best known for its tractor show once a year in the month of September. The community also has an elementary school and a middle school. It was first listed as a CDP in the 2020 census with a population of 399.

Hester Store was listed on the National Register of Historic Places in 2013.

Dacusville is located in the Greenville-Anderson Metropolitan Statistical Area and the Greenville-Spartanburg-Anderson Combined Statistical Area.

History
Dacusville was named for Archibald Dacus. Dacus was born in Lunenburg County, Virginia, in 1769, to John and Mara Dacus. In the late seventeen hundreds, he moved with several of his family to Upper State South Carolina.  He ran a trading post on the old Indian Road that ran from Virginia through North and South Carolina into Georgia territory, at what soon came to be called Dacusville, to trade with the Indians and passers-by, as well as local people.  It is said that this was first called "The Trap". This was also a stage coach stop.  History relates there had been a post office in this vicinity since Revolutionary War days which had been operated from more than one location by various people.  Archibald Dacus began to operate the post office from his trading post (store) and the place was called "Dacusville" after him.

Demographics

2020 census

Note: the US Census treats Hispanic/Latino as an ethnic category. This table excludes Latinos from the racial categories and assigns them to a separate category. Hispanics/Latinos can be of any race.

References

External links
Dacus Family Cemetery, Pickens County, SC

Unincorporated communities in Pickens County, South Carolina
Unincorporated communities in South Carolina
Census-designated places in Pickens County, South Carolina
Census-designated places in South Carolina